Daut is a given name. Notable people with the name include:
 Daut Boriçi (1825–1896), Albanian alim, müderris and nationalist figure
 Daut Dauti (born 1960), born in 1960 in Kokaj, near Gjilan, in Kosova
 Daut Demaku (born 1944), Albanian writer and lecturer
 Daut Haradinaj (born 1978), Kosovo Albanian politician
 Daut Musekwa (born 1988), Zambian footballer

See also 
 Daut (surname)